The men's Finn class at the 2014 ISAF Sailing World Championships was held in Santander, Spain 16–19 September.

Results

References

Finn
Finn Gold Cup